The term chime hours originated in the north of England and refers to one of several myths related to the time of one’s birth. It was popularized by folklorist Ruth Tongue who also coined the terms “chime child” or “chime children”. The idea behind this piece of folklore is that individuals born during certain hours of the day or night gain special abilities - although what these times are seems to be disputed depending on the individual source or location. What abilities being born at these times grant also seem to range dramatically from source to source with talk of everything from being extraordinarily perceptive towards animals to being able to see ghosts. There are claims of these abilities having at one time led to accusations of witchcraft. It is also said that if chime children or other similarly gifted individuals make use of their abilities for selfish reasons rather than for the benefit of others they are to perish “miserably and spiritually”.
Similar myths have been said to exist in various other parts of the world including Ireland, Scotland, Denmark, and China.

Prominent Debates

Chime Hours
There is much contention over which hours comprise the chime hours. Some argue that the only true chime hour is twelve a.m., midnight as referenced by Charles Dickens in the first chapter of David Copperfield. This is generally agreed upon by the people of Somerset and Yorkshire.
According to those in Somerset and East Anglia, the chime hours often corresponded with the chiming of church bells marking the hours of monastic prayer (Matins) at eight p.m., midnight and four a.m. In an article for the journal Folklore published by The Folklore Society, Grace Hadow and Ruth Anderson suggest the addition of midday to these hours, referring to the chime hours as eight, midnight, four, and midday.
Those in Sussex site the chime hours as being three, six, nine, and twelve o’clock while Ruth Tongue claims these “potent ghostly hours” to be from Friday at midnight to cockcrow on Saturday morning.

Powers or Abilities Granted
There are a wide array of abilities said to be granted to those born within the chime hours. For example, some claim that these include the ability to see ghosts or spirits  and to speak to these ghosts and fairies without risk of coming to any harm.
Others claim these abilities include power over black witchcraft, being musically gifted, control over animals, and being able to cure ailing animals and plants. Additionally, “chime children” are believed to be born with the ability to have exclusive access to sensitive information due to others lowering their guards and speaking openly around these individuals. As Thomas Thistleton-Dyer words it, these individuals have access to “much that is hidden from others”.

Ruth Tongue attempted to compile an official list of abilities that she and her fellow “chime children” were capable of. This consisted of being able “to see the dead and the fairies, and speak with them but come to no harm – such encounters must never be sought”, “to have immunity from all ill-wishing, as many of the clergy have”, “to love and control all animals – so chime children often become herdsmen or veterinary surgeons” and, “to have a knowledge of herbs and a way of healing others”.

Ruth Tongue 
Ruth Tongue (1898-1981) was the individual to coin the term “chime child” and draw further attention to the myth of the chime hours by claiming to be one of these “chime children” herself. This was not her only claim to fame, as she made a successful living as a folklorist in general. Tongue documented her experiences as a “chime child” in several publications including Somerset Folklore (1965) and The Chime Child, or Somerset Singers (1968), in which she recalls this rhyme about “chime children” that she recalled having recited to her by a local sexton’s wife as a child:

“They that be born of a Friday’s chime
Be masters of musick and finders of rhyme,
And every beast will do what they say,
And every herb that do grow in the clay,
They do see what they see and hear what they hear,
But they never do tell in a hundred year”.

While some regard her words and self-proclaimed first-hand experience as law in terms of the chime hours, it has become clear that she did not grow up in Somerset, where she claims to have spent her childhood and obtained much of the folklore that she would later document. Due to this, there are some individuals that question whether or not she may have made some amount of her material up or inaccurately recalled past experiences. As Jacqueline Simpson and Stephen Roud word it in A Dictionary of English Folklore, Tongue’s many tales in The Chime Child (1968) are “based on very early childhood memories; in Forgotten Folktales she gives only the vaguest hints as to where, when, and from whom she had obtained the stories; any notes she may have made at the time were lost in moves and fires.”

Mentions of the Chime Hours

Literature
Adam Slater's The Shadowing #2: Skinned
Leon Garfield's Empty Sleeve
Franny Billingsley's, Chime (novel)
Edward Storey's, Almost a Chime Child
Charles Dickens', David Copperfield
Kate Morton's The Clockmaker's Daughter

Music/Art
Faster Than Sound - The Chimes Hour
Memotone - Chime Hours

References

English folklore